is a voice actor talent management firm in Shinjuku, Tokyo, Japan.

Attached voice actors

Male
Masashi Hirose
Takanori Hoshino
Hiroya Ishimaru
Masafumi Kimura
Ikuo Nishikawa
Jirō Saitō
Takayuki Sakazume
Hiroshi Shirokuma
Jun'ichi Sugawara
Takashi Taguchi
Katsumi Toriumi
Eiji Yanagisawa

Female

Sayaka Aoki
Mioko Fujiwara
Natsumi Hioka
Mana Hirata
Junko Hori
Chizuko Hoshino
Hisako Kanemoto
Sanae Kobayashi
Satomi Kōrogi
Nami Kurokawa
Chihiro Kusaka
Mari Mashiba
Yuki Matsuoka
Atsuko Mine
Eri Miyajima
Emi Motoi
Manami Tanaka
Akiko Yajima

Formerly attached voice actors

Male
Kinryū Arimoto (affiliated with Heiya Kikaku, now deceased)
Eisuke Asakura (now affiliated with Arts Vision)
Kenichi Ogata (now affiliated with Umikaze)
Chō (Yūichi Nagashima) (now affiliated with the Tokyo Actor's Consumer's Cooperative Society)
Jun Fukuyama (now affiliated with AXLONE)
Tōru Furusawa (now affiliated with Kenyū Office)
Jun Hazumi (now affiliated with Arts Vision)
Satoshi Hino (now affiliated with AXLONE)
Katsuhisa Hōki (now affiliated with Kenyū Office)
Kenyū Horiuchi (now the director of Kenyū Office)
Kazuhiko Inoue (now affiliated with B-Box)
Ryūzō Ishino (now affiliated with 81 Produce)
Akira Kamiya
Kaneta Kimotsuki (affiliated with Winner Entertainment, director of 21st Century FOX now deceased)
Takurō Kitagawa (now affiliated with Sigma Seven)
Takehito Koyasu (now the director of Diizufakutorii)
Yasunori Matsumoto (now affiliated with Sigma Seven)
Takahiro Mizushima (now affiliated with AXLONE)
Mugihito (Makoto Terada) (now affiliated with Media Office)
Shūsei Nakamura (retired/deceased)
Ken Narita (now a freelance voice actor)
Hideki Ogihara (now affiliated with Diizufakutorii)
Takayuki Okada (now affiliated with Kenyū Office)
Kōsuke Okano (now a freelance voice actor)
Kenichi Ono (now affiliated with Rimakkusu)
Shinya Ōtaki (now a freelance voice actor)
Mitsuo Senda (now affiliated with 81 Produce)
Yutaka Shimaka (now affiliated with Production★A Collection)
Noriaki Sugiyama (now affiliated with Stay Luck)
Katsumi Suzuki (now affiliated with Arts Vision)
Seiichi Suzuki (deceased, enrolled at the time of death)
Nobuyuki Tanaka
Kazuya Tatekabe (director of Kenyū Office before time of death)
Kōsei Tomita (deceased)
Kei Tomiyama (deceased, enrolled at the time of death)
Keaton Yamada (now at Remax)
Ken Yamaguchi (deceased, the director of OYS Produce until his death)
Takumi Yamazaki (now affiliated with T.S.P.)
Shinnosuke Tachibana  (now affiliated with AXLONE)
Yuzuru Fujimoto (now affiliated with 81 Produce)
Hiroshi Naka (now affiliated with Ken Production)
Takuo Kawamura (now affiliated with Bell Production)
Takayuki Sakazume (now affiliated with Kenyū Office)

Female

Runa Akiyama (now affiliated with 81 Produce)
Mayumi Asano (now affiliated with Office Osawa)
Sachiko Chijimatsu (now affiliated with 81 Produce)
Yūko Gotō (now affiliated with AXLONE)
Teiyū Ichiryūsai (now a freelance voice actress)
Rei Igarashi (now affiliated with Office Osawa)
Kazue Ikura (Kazu Ikura) (now affiliated with Aoni Production)
Mai Kadowaki (now affiliated with Kaleidoscope
Tomoko Kawakami (deceased)
Madoka Kimura (now a freelance voice actress)
Chie Kōjiro (now affiliated with 81 Produce)
Naoko Matsui (now the head of UP AND UPS)
Yūko Mizutani (deceased)
Masako Nozawa (now affiliated with Aoni Production)
Noriko Ohara (now a freelance voice actress)
Ai Orikasa (now affiliated with AXLONE)
Yoshiko Sakakibara (later moved to Tokyo Actor's Consumer's Cooperative Society, currently freelance)
Yūko Sanpei (now affiliated with AXLONE)
Yūko Satō (now affiliated with Aksent)
Kei Shindō (now affiliated with AXLONE)
Miki Takahashi (now affiliated with SplashDream)
Kumiko Takizawa (now affiliated with 81 Produce)
Akane Tomonaga (now affiliated with AXLONE)
Hitomi Harada (now affiliated with Office Anemone)

External links
 Production Baobab (official site)

Talent agencies based in Tokyo
Japanese voice actor management companies
Mass media companies based in Tokyo
Japanese companies established in 1979